The 2008 Atlantic Hockey Men's Ice Hockey Tournament was the 5th conference tournament in league history. It was played between March 7 and March 16, 2008. Quarterfinal games were played at home team campus sites, while all 'Final Five' games were played at the Blue Cross Arena in Rochester, New York. By winning the tournament, Air Force received Atlantic Hockey's automatic bid to the 2008 NCAA Division I Men's Ice Hockey Tournament.

Format
The tournament featured four rounds of play. Teams were seeded No. 1 through No. 10 according to their final conference standing, with a tiebreaker system used to seed teams with an identical number of points accumulated. The top five seeded teams each earned home ice and hosted one of the lower seeded teams. All quarterfinal matchups were best-of-three series with the top three remaining seeds receiving byes into the semifinal round and the lowest two remaining seeds playing in a four-vs-five match. All rounds after the quarterfinals were conducted as single-elimination games. The winner of the four-vs-five game would advance to the semifinals to play the highest remaining seed while the other two remaining seeds faced off in the other semifinal game. The winners of the semifinal games advanced to play each other in a championship game with the tournament champion receiving an automatic bid to the 2008 NCAA Division I Men's Ice Hockey Tournament.

Conference standings
Note: GP = Games played; W = Wins; L = Losses; T = Ties; PTS = Points; GF = Goals For; GA = Goals Against

Bracket

Teams are reseeded after the Quarterfinals

Note: * denotes overtime period(s)

Quarterfinals

(1) Army vs. (10) American International

(2) RIT vs. (9) Holy Cross

(3) Air Force vs. (8) Bentley

(4) Sacred Heart vs. (7) Connecticut

(5) Mercyhurst vs. (6) Canisius

Four vs. Five

(4) Sacred Heart vs. (5) Mercyhurst

Semifinals

(1) Army vs. (5) Mercyhurst

(2) RIT vs. (3) Air Force

Championship

(3) Air Force vs. (5) Mercyhurst

Tournament awards

All-Tournament Team
G Andrew Volkening (Air Force)
D Matt Charbonneau (Air Force)
D Jeff Terminesi (Mercyhurst)
F Brent Olson* (Air Force)
F Matt Pierce (Mercyhurst)
F Chris Risi (Mercyhurst)
* Most Valuable Player(s)

References

Aha tournament
Atlantic Hockey Tournament